New Village is an unincorporated community and census-designated place (CDP) located within Franklin Township in Warren County, New Jersey, United States, that was created as part of the 2010 United States Census. As of the 2010 Census, the CDP's population was 421.

Geography
According to the United States Census Bureau, the CDP had a total area of 0.949 square miles (2.457 km2), all of which was land.

Demographics

Census 2010

Notable people

People who were born in, residents of, or otherwise closely associated with New Village include:
 Pete Perini (1928-2008), fullback who played two seasons in the National Football League with the Chicago Bears and Cleveland Browns.

References

Census-designated places in Warren County, New Jersey
Franklin Township, Warren County, New Jersey